Deep Run Park is a public park located in western Henrico County, Virginia at the northwest corner of Gaskins Road and Ridgefield Parkway. 

Henrico County acquired an initial 52.045 acres of land for the park in 1978 and an additional 108.767 acres in 1979, although the park was not opened for public use until 1987. An additional 3.98 acres of land was acquired in 2004, increasing the total size of the park to 164.792 acres.

Park features include:
 Picnic Area
 Picnic Shelter
 Restrooms
 Play Equipment and swingset
 Open Play Areas
 Exercise Trails
 Hiking/Nature Trails
 Fishing
 Concessions
 Baseball/Softball Fields
 Soccer/Football Fields
 Recreation Center

References 

Parks in Henrico County, Virginia